Arbúcies is a village in the province of Girona, in the autonomous community of Catalonia, Spain.

History
Arbúcies was populated by the Iberians and later by the Romans. In the Middle Ages, when feudalism was established, Montsoriu Castle and viscounts of Cabrera were very important.

The Battle of Arbúcies took place on 14 January 1714 during the War of the Spanish Succession between the militia of the surrounding area, supporters of Archduke Charles of Austria, and the Walloon forces of the Duke of Anjou. The clash took place near the Arbúcies stream, against a 15th-century mill. Bourbon troops, en route from Hostalric to Vic, were totally defeated and lost six flags. The town of Arbúcies was completely burnt in the wave of repression unleashed by the Duke of Pópoli.

Economy
Arbúcies' main industry is the manufacturing of bus chassis. The principal manufacturing companies of Spain are located in Arbúcies: Beulas, Ayats, Indcar, and Noge.

The other important industry in the village is Jocavi, a textile company that manufactures clothes for women and exports to all Europe.

Notable people
 Keita Baldé, footballer
 Antonio Durán, former football player and coach

References

External links
 Government data pages 

Municipalities in Selva